Vidu (My Kind of Hero), colloquially as Vidhu, is a 2010 Sri Lankan Sinhala children's film directed by Asoka Handagama and co-produced by Iranthi Abeyasinghe, Jagath Wijenayaka, Prashant Rathi, Kanwar Inder Singh Rai and Prasanna Vithanage for Silumina Films. It stars Chandani Seneviratne and child actor Thanishka Vimalarathne in lead roles along with Gamini Hettiarachchi and Saumya Liyanage. Music composed by Kapila Pugalarachchi. It is the 1149th Sri Lankan film in the Sinhala cinema.

Plot
An adolescent boy with no birth certificate, denied access to free education.  He overwhelms the whole country and achieves what he has been dreaming in daylight.

Cast
 Thanishka Vimalarathne as Vidu
 Chandani Seneviratne as Vidu's mother
 Saumya Liyanage as Politician			
 Shamila Nimanthi Frenando as Chathu	
 Gamini Hettiarachchi as Principal		
 Himasal Liyanage as Politician's son

Soundtrack

References

External links

2010 films
2010s Sinhala-language films